The Spirits Act 1742 (commonly known as the Gin Act of 1743) was an Act of the Parliament of Great Britain repealing the Gin Act 1736 in favor of lower taxes and license fees.

Background
The Gin Act of 1736 attempted to curb gin consumption by instituting a 20 shilling per gallon excise tax as well as a £50 annual license (equivalent to £ today) for all gin sellers. The law proved immensely unpopular and provoked public rioting and widespread defiance. It is said that only two of the annual licenses were ever purchased and many people turned to producing homemade gins.

In light of the difficulty in enforcing the law (and the financial strain of the War of the Austrian Succession), the Gin Act of 1743 reduced the cost of an annual gin selling license from £50 to just 20 shillings. The excise tax on gin producers and penalties for violating the law were also significantly reduced. The question of taxing and regulating gin was later revisited by the Gin Act 1751.

References

Alcohol law in the United Kingdom
Great Britain Acts of Parliament 1742